The Gold Medal of the Guildhall School of Music and Drama is awarded in April of each year to the winner of the school's music competition. It is awarded in alternate years to a singer and an instrumentalist. Gold Medals are also awarded for other aspects of the School's programme, including Drama.

List of winners of the Gold Medal
1924: Isidore Godfrey (piano)
1933: Max Jaffa
1938: Gordon Bartlett Holdom (baritone)
1960: Jacqueline du Pré (cello)
1968: Barbara Flynn
1980: Julian Tear
1981: Susan Bickley
1982: Simon Emes
1983: Carol Smith
1984: Kyoko Kimura
1985: Peter Rose
1986: Tasmin Little (violin)
1987: Juliet Booth
1998: Simon Smith
1989: Bryn Terfel (bass-baritone)
1990: Eryl Lloyd-Williams
1991: William Dazeley
1992: Katherine Gowers
1993: Nathan Berg
1994: Richard Jenkinson
1995: Jane Stevenson
1996: Stephen de Pledge
1997: Konrad Jarnot
1998: Alexander Somov
1999: Natasha Jouhl
2000: Maxim Rysanov
2001: Sarah Redgwick
2002: David Cohen
2003: Susanna Andersson
2004: Boris Brovtsyn
2005: Anna Stephany (soprano)
2006: Anna-Liisa Bezrodny (violin)
2007: Katherine Broderick (soprano)
2008: Sasha Grynyuk (piano)
2009: Gary Griffiths (baritone)
2010: Martyna Jatkauskaite (piano)
2011: Natalya Romaniw (soprano)
2012: Ashley Fripp (piano)
2013: Magdalena Malendowska (soprano)
2014: Michael Petrov (cello)
2015: Jennifer Witton (soprano) & Marta Fontanals-Simmons (mezzo-soprano)
2016: Oliver Wass (harp)
2017: Josep-Ramon Olivé (baritone)
2018: Joon Yoon (piano)
2019: Samantha Clarke (soprano)
2020: Soohong Park (piano)
2021: Tom Mole (bariton)

External links
 Official website

Guildhall School of Music and Drama
Music competitions in the United Kingdom
Events in London
Awards established in 1915
1915 establishments in the United Kingdom